"Surekill" is the eighth episode of the eighth season of the American science fiction television series The X-Files. The episode was written by Greg Walker and directed by Terrence O'Hara. "Surekill" is a "Monster-of-the-Week" story, unconnected to the series' wider mythology. The episode received a Nielsen rating of 8.0 and was viewed by 13.3 million viewers. Overall, the episode received largely negative reviews from critics.

The series centers on FBI special agents Dana Scully (Gillian Anderson) and her new partner John Doggett (Robert Patrick)—following the alien abduction of her former partner, Fox Mulder (David Duchovny)—who work on cases linked to the paranormal, called X-Files. In this episode, the fatal shooting of a realtor, while alone in a cinderblock jail cell, has Doggett struggling to find out who committed the murder and how the crime was committed. Scully and Doggett, however, soon learn that there is more to this case than meets the eye.

Due to the presence of his "biker buddy" Michael Bowen, series co-star Robert Patrick was noticeably more energized than usual to film the episode, according to Gillian Anderson. In addition, scenes at "AAA-1 Surekill Exterminators", the business run by Randall and Dwight, were filmed at an actual business front located on Palmetto Street in Los Angeles.

Plot
In Worcester, Massachusetts, Carlton Chase runs from an unknown assailant, makes a brief phone call, and then runs to a police station. After a skirmish with the guards, he is placed in a large room with cinder blocks for walls and a solid steel door. He screams at the officer that he still is not safe. Suddenly, and mysteriously, he is shot from inside the room. Dana Scully (Gillian Anderson) and John Doggett (Robert Patrick) are informed that Chase was killed with an armor-piercing round, which appears to have entered the room through the air vent in the ceiling. Upon further investigation, the agents discover that the assassin shot through the roof, ceiling and ductwork, and into the victim.

Tammi Peyton enters AAA-1 Surekill Exterminators and plays her message machine, which contains the victim's phone call from the previous night. She attempts to get into her right desk drawer, when Dwight walks in, and begins harassing her about a message on the machine. She mentions the murder to Dwight, and he responds by asking her to try to get Randall on the phone. Dwight then confronts Randall in the alley; Dwight tells him that he doesn't mind what he does, as long as he asks first. Later, Scully and Doggett investigate the Chase residence and find a bullet casing on the floor. Doggett notes that it would be difficult to miss a target in a confined space, but Scully notes it would have if the gunman was shooting from outside. Eventually, Scully proposes that the killer can perceive wave lengths of light not visible with an ordinary human eye, allowing him to virtually see through walls.

Scully and Doggett arrive at Surekill and inquire as to the company's client, Carlton Chase. Doggett asks if Dwight did time, and he responds that he did. Doggett asks why Chase would have called Surekill just before his death. After the agents leave, Dwight confronts Tammi about the message, and she lies. Meanwhile, Randall watches Tammi through a wall. Tammi returns to Surekill early the next morning and rushes in to get the deposit book showing she has taken from the Surekill account out of her desk, but is caught by Dwight and Randall. Dwight is interrupted by the FBI, who have a search warrant. Doggett opens the box Tammi was trying to dispose of, which contains nothing, much to her surprise. Dwight claims he runs a clean business, but Scully pulls out several folders containing invoices for Chase.

Doggett interrogates Dwight, and Scully interrogates Randall. Randall repeats Dwight's words as he reads his lips through a wall. Randall replies that he and Dwight are just exterminators. Later, Tammi returns home and meets up with Randall, and the two go to the bus station. It becomes clear that they intend to run away together, but that Tammi must go get her stash of money. Meanwhile, Doggett finds phone records that show that Tammi and Chase had back and forth phone calls, late at night. Doggett and Scully search Tammi's apartment, and Doggett redials Tammi's phone, getting the bus station.

Tammi returns from the bank and gets back in her car. Dwight surprises her from the back seat and puts a gun to her head, and tells her to drive. Dwight comes to the conclusion that Randall killed Chase because he and Tammi were together. Dwight hands Randall a gun and tells him to shoot Tammi. Tammi tries to talk Randall out of it but Randall shoots through the wall next to her and kills Dwight. Randall is eventually arrested, but Tammi successfully manages to run away.

Production

"Surekill" was written by executive story editor Greg Walker, and marked his second script contribution to the series, after season seven's "Brand X". "Surekill" was the first and only episode of The X-Files to be directed by Terrence O'Hara. Although the episode was the eighth aired in the season, it was actually the ninth one filmed, as evidenced by its production number: 8ABX09. Scenes at "AAA-1 Surekill Exterminators", the business ran by Randall and Dwight, were filmed at an actual business front located on Palmetto Street in Los Angeles.

"Surekill" guest starred Michael Bowen, a "biker buddy" of series co-star Robert Patrick. Because of this, Patrick was noticeably more energetic on the set of the episode. Co-star Gillian Anderson recounted, "Robert was like an Energizer Bunny. He was just wound and wouldn't unwind until the day was done, no matter how long the day went. So that picked up the energy of the series, in a sense."

Reception
"Surekill" first aired on Fox on January 7, 2001. The episode earned a Nielsen household rating of 8.0, meaning that it was seen by 8.0% of the nation's estimated households. The episode was viewed by 8.18 million households, and 13.3 million viewers. The episode ranked as the 36th most-watched episode for the week ending December 3. The episode subsequently aired in the United Kingdom on the BBC Two on April 28, 2002. Fox promoted the episode with the tagline "Ever feel like someone's watching you?"

The episode received largely negative reviews from critics. Television Without Pity writer Jessica Morgan rated the episode a B−, called the premise "bor-ring ", and noted that the episode's antagonist "don't do a whole hell of a lot". Zack Handlen of The A.V. Club awarded the episode a "B−" and called the episode "thoroughly mundane", especially in comparison to the preceding episode, "Via Negativa". Handlen felt that "because all of this is very familiar, and without any of the characters distinguishing themselves, there isn’t much reason to watch." Ultimately, he concluded that "'Surekill' isn't terrible, but it's far too easy to see right through."

Robert Shearman and Lars Pearson, in their book Wanting to Believe: A Critical Guide to The X-Files, Millennium & The Lone Gunmen, rated the episode one star out of five. The two derided the episode for being overly "dull", noting "you watch with open mouth amazement that writer Greg Walker can spin this premise out for forty-five minutes." Paula Vitaris from Cinefantastique gave the episode a negative review and awarded it one-and-a-half stars out of four. Vitaris noted that the episode "takes itself far too seriously", which resulted in "lifeless guest characters".

Notes

Footnotes

Bibliography

External links 

2001 American television episodes
Television episodes set in Massachusetts
The X-Files (season 8) episodes